The Cadillac Three (originally known as The Cadillac Black) is the debut studio album by American country rock band The Cadillac Three, initially released on April 17, 2012 via Nobody Buys Records.  Due to the band's decision to change their name and signing to major label Big Machine Records, the album has been reissued several times (see the various different covers). It was reissued on the Big Machine label on May 7, 2013. In Europe, the album was released as Tennessee Mojo with bonus tracks.

The band produced the album itself, with assistance from Dave Cobb on "Tennessee Mojo" and "Whiskey Soaked Redemption". It has sold 40,000 copies in the United States as of July 2016.

Track listing

Chart performance

References

2012 debut albums
The Cadillac Three albums
Big Machine Records albums